Leonard Jones was a footballer who played as a forward in the Football League for Burslem Port Vale in the early 1900s.

Career
Jones played for Eastwood, before joining Burslem Port Vale in April 1901. He scored on his debut at the Athletic Ground; a 3–0 win over Leicester Fosse on 12 October 1901. He made two further Second Division appearances in the 1901–02 season. After just one game in the 1902–03 season he left the club.

Career statistics
Source:

References

Year of birth missing
Year of death missing
English footballers
Association football forwards
Port Vale F.C. players
English Football League players